Alfred Grislawski (2 November 191919 September 2003) was a German Luftwaffe fighter ace and recipient of the Knight's Cross of the Iron Cross with Oak Leaves during World War II. He was credited with 133 victories claimed in over 800 combat missions. He recorded 24 victories over the Western Front, including 18 United States Army Air Forces (USAAF) four–engine bombers. Of his 109 claims recorded over the Eastern Front, 16 were Il-2 Sturmoviks.

List of aerial victories claimed
According to US historian David T. Zabecki, Grislawski was credited with 132 aerial victories. Spick lists him with 133 aerial victories. Obermaier also lists Grislawski with 133 aerial victories claimed in 795 combat missions, including 175 close air support missions. He claimed 109 victories over the Eastern Front. Of his 24 victories claimed over the Western Front, eighteen were four-engined bombers. Mathews and Foreman, authors of Luftwaffe Aces — Biographies and Victory Claims, researched the German Federal Archives and found records for 127 aerial victory claims, plus one further unconfirmed claim. This figure includes 108 aerial victories on the Eastern Front and 19 on the Western Front, including 14 four-engined bombers

Victory claims were logged to a map-reference (PQ = Planquadrat), for example "PQ 47654". These sectors were then subdivided into 36 smaller units to give a location area 3 × 4 km in size.

Notes

References

Citations

Bibliography

 
 
 
 
 
 
 
 
 
 
 
 
 
 

Aerial victories of Grislawski, Alfred
Grislawski, Alfred
Aviation in World War II